Kendall Isaiah McIntosh (born January 24, 1994) is an American professional soccer player who plays as a goalkeeper for Major League Soccer club Sporting Kansas City.

Career

Youth, College and Amateur
McIntosh was a member of the San Jose Earthquakes Academy before spending his entire college career at Santa Clara University.  He made a total 53 appearances for the Broncos between 2012 and 2015.

He also played in the Premier Development League for FC Tucson and Burlingame Dragons.

Portland Timbers
On March 18, 2016, McIntosh signed a professional contract with USL club Portland Timbers 2. He made his league debut for the reserve side on 23 April 2016 in a 2-0 away victory against Tulsa Roughnecks FC. He picked up a yellow card in the 19th minute.

New York Red Bulls
On 26 November 2019, McIntosh was selected by New York Red Bulls in Stage 1 of the 2019 MLS Re-Entry Draft. On December 21, 2021, McIntosh was named New York Red Bulls Humanitarian of the Year for his work responding to issues of racism and social injustice as well as his fundraising for the NAACP Legal Defense and Educational Fund, the National Black Child Developmental Institute and the Thurgood Marshall College Fund. McIntosh was released by New York following the 2020 season.

Sporting Kansas City
On 17 December 2020, McIntosh was selected by Sporting Kansas City in Stage 1 of the 2020 MLS Re-Entry Draft, officially signing with the club on January 5, 2021. After featuring prominently for Sporting Kansas City II throughout the 2021 season, McIntosh signed a new contract for the 2022 Major League Soccer season with an option for 2023.

International
McIntosh has represented the United States in the U17 and U20 level.

References

External links

 

1994 births
Living people
American soccer players
Association football goalkeepers
Santa Clara Broncos men's soccer players
FC Tucson players
Burlingame Dragons FC players
Portland Timbers 2 players
Portland Timbers players
New York Red Bulls players
Soccer players from California
Sporting Kansas City players
Sporting Kansas City II players
Sportspeople from Santa Rosa, California
USL League Two players
USL Championship players
United States men's youth international soccer players
United States men's under-20 international soccer players
MLS Next Pro players
Major League Soccer players